Dihirpa is a genus of moths in the family Saturniidae first described by Max Wilhelm Karl Draudt in 1929.

Species
Dihirpa lamasi Lemaire, 1982
Dihirpa litura (Walker, 1855)

References

Hemileucinae